Brink is a Low German, Dutch, Danish and Swedish toponymic surname. The Dutch and Low German meaning is "village green". In Danish and Swedish, the name is thought to be a borrowing of Middle Dutch  / , meaning "grassy edge" or perhaps "slope", and the Danish word now means "where the water runs deep". Notable people with the surname include:

Aaron Brink (born 1974), American mixed martial artist
Alex Brink (born 1985), Canadian Football League quarterback
André Brink (1935–2015), South African novelist
Andries Brink (1877–1947), South African lieutenant general 
Bernhard Brink (born 1952), German singer
Bobby Brink (born 2001), American ice hockey player
Brad Brink (born 1965), American baseball pitcher
Bridget A. Brink, American diplomat
Carol Ryrie Brink (1895–1981), American novelist
Charles Brink (1907–1994), German-born British classical scholar
Chris Brink (born 1951), South African academic
Christian Brink (born 1983), Norwegian footballer
Cyle Brink (born 1994), South African rugby player
David Brink (businessman) (born 1939), South African businessman
David Brink (cyclist) (born 1947), American racing cyclist
David M. Brink (1930–2021), Australian-British nuclear physicist
David O. Brink (born 1958), American philosopher
David R. Brink (1919–2017), American attorney, American Bar Association president
Elga Brink (1905–1985), German film actress
Francis G. Brink (1893-1952), American military officer
Gary J. Brink (fl. 1973–99), American set decorator
George Brink (1889–1971), South African lieutenant general
James Brink (1925–2017), American tennis player
Jan Brink (born 1960), Swedish equestrian
Johannes Brink (1912–1976), Dutch freestyle swimmer
Jörgen Brink (born 1974), Swedish cross-country skier and biathlete
Jos Brink (1942–2007), Dutch performer and journalist
Josefin Brink (born 1969), Swedish politician
Julius Brink (born 1982), German beach volleyball player
Kalle Brink (born 1975), Swedish golfer
Kennadi Brink, ring name of Jessika Heiser (born 1993), American professional wrestler
Kim Brink (born 1958), Danish football manager
Larry Brink (1928–2016), American football defensive lineman
Lars Brink (born 1943), Swedish theoretical physicist
Maria Brink (born 1977), American heavy metal singer and songwriter
Mark Brink (born 1998), Danish football midfielder
 (1914–1947), German World War II resistance member
Michael Brink (born 1996), South African rugby player
Milton Brink (1910–1999), American ice hockey player
Raymond Woodard Brink (1890–1973), American mathematician
Rikke Holm Brink (born 1972), Danish footballer
Robby Brink (born 1971), South African rugby player
Robert Brink (1924–2014), American violinist, conductor, and educator
Robert H. Brink (born 1946), American (Virginia) Democratic politician
Royal Alexander Brink (1897–1984), Canadian-born American plant geneticist
 (1937–1990), Dutch jazz saxophonist and clarinetist
Sjoert Brink (born 1981), Dutch bridge player
Sjonni Brink (1974–2011), Icelandic singer
Stefan Brink (born 1952), Swedish philologist

See also
Ten Brink, Dutch surname
Van den Brink, Dutch surname

References

Danish-language surnames
Dutch-language surnames
Low German surnames
Swedish-language surnames
Toponymic surnames